İntikam is a Turkish primetime drama television series that aired on Kanal D, starring Beren Saat and Yiğit Özşener. It debuted on January 3, 2013. İntikam is the Turkish version of the ABC TV series Revenge created by Mike Kelley. The plot is inspired by Alexandre Dumas' 1844 novel The Count of Monte Cristo.

Overview

Yağmur Özden moves to a yalı in a rich neighborhood on the shore of the Bosphorus in Istanbul. Her real name is Derin Çelik. Her father, Adil was framed for a crime he didn't commit and sent to prison. Derin was sent to an orphanage and believed that her father was guilty. Adil wanted his daughter to learn the truth and kept a diary to be given to her. Derin learned the truth about her father when she was 18. But it was too late. He died in jail as an innocent man. Derin comes to her childhood neighborhood with a different identity to seek revenge against the people who betrayed her father.

Cast and characters

Main cast

Seasons

General Manager 
 Giovanni Mastrangelo

International broadcasts

External links 
 Hamptons Exposed

 
Turkish drama television series
Television series by D Productions
2013 Turkish television series debuts
2014 Turkish television series endings
Kanal D original programming
Turkish television series based on American television series
Turkish-language television shows
Mass media portrayals of the upper class
Psychological thriller television series
Television series about revenge
Serial drama television series
Television series about dysfunctional families
Television series by ABC Studios
Television series produced in Istanbul
Television shows set in Istanbul
Television series set in the 2010s
Wrongful convictions in fiction
Television shows based on The Count of Monte Cristo